Yach Mayom Bol (born 29 March 1997) is a South Sudanese footballer who plays as a defender for Australian club Geelong SC and the South Sudan national team.

References

1996 births
Living people
People from Warrap (state)
South Sudanese footballers
Association football defenders
South Sudan international footballers
South Sudanese expatriate footballers
South Sudanese expatriate sportspeople in Australia
Expatriate soccer players in Australia
Green Gully SC players
National Premier Leagues players